Circleville Township is one of the fifteen townships of Pickaway County, Ohio, United States.  The 2000 census found 2,300 people in the township.

Geography
Located in the eastern part of the county, it borders the following townships:
Walnut Township - north
Washington Township - east
Perry Township - south
Wayne Township - southwest
Jackson Township - northwest

Central Circleville Township is occupied by the city of Circleville, the county seat of Pickaway County.  In southwestern Circleville Township is located the census-designated place of Logan Elm Village.

Name and history
It is the only Circleville Township statewide.

Circleville Township was organized in 1833.

Government
The township is governed by a three-member board of trustees, who are elected in November of odd-numbered years to a four-year term beginning on the following January 1. Two are elected in the year after the presidential election and one is elected in the year before it. There is also an elected township fiscal officer, who serves a four-year term beginning on April 1 of the year after the election, which is held in November of the year before the presidential election. Vacancies in the fiscal officership or on the board of trustees are filled by the remaining trustees.

References

External links
County website

Townships in Pickaway County, Ohio
Townships in Ohio